A list of notable politicians of the defunct German Democratic Party:

A
 Emil Abderhalden
 Gustav Altenhain

B
 Friedrich Baltrusch
 Marie Baum
 Gertrud Bäumer
 Adolf Bauser
 Ludwig Bergsträsser
 Andreas Blunck
 Friedrich Burmeister

C
 Julius Curtius

D
 Thomas Dehler
 Berthold Deimling
 Bernhard Dernburg

F
 Richard Freudenberg
 Ferdinand Friedensburg

G
 Hellmut von Gerlach
 Otto Gessler
 Eberhard Gothein

H
 Willy Hellpach
 Theodor Heuss
 Elly Heuss-Knapp
 Karl Hoffmann
 Hermann Höpker-Aschoff
 Erhard Hübener
 Hermann Hummel

K
 Harry Kessler
 Wilhelm Kobelt
 Waldemar Koch
 Erich Koch-Weser
 Wilhelm Külz

L
 Ludwig Landmann
 Helene Lange
 Theodor Liesching
 Arthur Lieutenant
 Marie Elisabeth Lüders
 Erich Lüth

M
 Hermann Maas
 Artur Mahraun
 Reinhold Maier
 Friedrich Meinecke
 Friedrich Middelhauve

N
 Friedrich Naumann
 Otto Nuschke

O
 Rudolf Oeser

P
 Rudolf Paul
 Friedrich von Payer
 Carl Wilhelm Petersen
 Hugo Preuß

Q
 Ludwig Quidde

R
 Fritz Raschig
 Walther Rathenau
 Paul Rohrbach

S
 Hjalmar Schacht
 Eugen Schiffer
 Wilhelmine Schirmer-Pröscher
 Walther Schreiber
 Walther Schücking
 Gerhart von Schulze-Gaevernitz
 Ernst Siehr
 Gustav Stolper

T
 Ernst Troeltsch

V
 Georg Voigt

W
 Alfred Weber
 Marianne Weber
 Max Weber
 Bernhard Weiß
 Eberhard Wildermuth
 Frieda Wunderlich

 
German Democratic Party